General Alexander may refer to:

Alexander (son of Polyperchon) (d. 314 BC), Macedonian general
Alexander (Aetolian general) (fl. 220 BC)
Alexander (Antigonid general) (fl. 220s BC)
Prince Charles Alexander of Lorraine (1712–1780), Austrian general
David Anderson (British Army officer) (1821–1909), British Army general
David Alexander (Royal Marines officer) (1926–2017), Royal Marines major general
Edward McGill Alexander (born 1947), South African Army major general
Edward Porter Alexander (1835–1910), Confederate States Army brigadier general
Ernest Alexander (1870–1934), British Army major general
Henry Templer Alexander (1911–1977), British Army major general
Harold Alexander, 1st Earl Alexander of Tunis (1891–1969), British Army major general
Keith B. Alexander (b. 1951), U.S. Army general
Milton Alexander (1796–1856), Illinois Militia brigadier general 
Robert Alexander (United States Army officer) (1863–1941), U.S. Army major general
Ronald Okeden Alexander (1888–1949), Canadian Army general
William Alexander, Lord Stirling (1726–1783), Continental Army major general
William Alexander (Glasgow MP) (1874–1954), British Army brigadier general

See also
David Alexander-Sinclair (1927–2014), British Army major general